Economy is a town in Perry Township, Wayne County, in the U.S. state of Indiana. The population was 173 at the 2021 census.

History
Economy was laid out and platted in 1825. The town was named by the original landowner, Charles Osborn, who thought of laying out the town into lots as the most "economical" way of selling off his property, hence the name Economy.

The Economy post office has been in operation since 1827.
Economy is mentioned in the Stephen King novel The Stand.

Geography
Economy is located at  (39.976293, -85.085945).

Demographics

2010 census
As of the census of 2010, there were 187 people, 73 households, and 47 families living in the town. The racial makeup of the town was 98.4% White and 1.6% from two or more races. Hispanic or Latino of any race were 2.1% of the population.

There were 73 households, of which 31.5% had children under the age of 18 living with them, 50.7% were married couples living together, 11.0% had a female householder with no husband present, 2.7% had a male householder with no wife present, and 35.6% were non-families. 28.8% of all households were made up of individuals, and 15.1% had someone living alone who was 65 years of age or older. The average household size was 2.56 and the average family size was 3.17.

The median age in the town was 38.6 years. 25.1% of residents were under the age of 18; 7.5% were between the ages of 18 and 24; 27.3% were from 25 to 44; 27.4% were from 45 to 64; and 12.8% were 65 years of age or older. The gender makeup of the town was 48.1% male and 51.9% female.

2000 census
As of the census of 2000, there were 200 people, 74 households, and 56 families living in the town. The racial makeup of the town was 99.00% White, and 1.00% from two or more races. Hispanic or Latino of any race were 1.00% of the population.

There were 74 households, out of which 40.5% had children under the age of 18 living with them, 59.5% were married couples living together, 12.2% had a female householder with no husband present, and 24.3% were non-families. 20.3% of all households were made up of individuals, and 13.5% had someone living alone who was 65 years of age or older. The average household size was 2.70 and the average family size was 3.07.

In the town, the population was spread out, with 29.5% under the age of 18, 5.0% from 18 to 24, 27.5% from 25 to 44, 24.5% from 45 to 64, and 13.5% who were 65 years of age or older. The median age was 37 years. For every 100 females, there were 94.2 males. For every 100 females age 18 and over, there were 83.1 males.

The median income for a household in the town was $37,083, and the median income for a family was $42,917. Males had a median income of $36,042 versus $21,250 for females. The per capita income for the town was $17,609. About 13.1% of families and 16.0% of the population were below the poverty line, including 25.5% of those under the age of eighteen and 22.2% of those 65 or over.

References

Towns in Indiana
Towns in Wayne County, Indiana